Survivor România 2020  is the first season of Survivor România, a Romanian television series based on the popular reality game show Survivor. The season featured 20 contestants divided into two tribes: "Faimoșii", composed of ten high-achievers who excelled in their fields, and "Războinicii", composed of ten everyday Romanians. The season premiered on 18 January 2020, and concluded on 30 May 2020, where Elena Ionescu was named the winner over Emanuel Neagu, Iancu Sterp and Lola Crudu, winning the grand prize of 250.000 lei and title of Sole Survivor. It was the first season to air on Kanal D and be hosted by Dan Cruceru, and was filmed in La Romana, Dominican Republic from January  to May 2020.

Contestants
Faimoșii tribe include a former elite gymnast, Asiana Peng, a former FCSB player, Mihai Onicaș and a professional boxer, Cezar Juratoni. Războinicii tribe include Ultimul trib contestant, Lola Crudu, Îmi place dansul finalist, Emanuel Neagu, Vocea României, X Factor România and Ninja Warrior România contestant, Andrei Ciobanu and Insula Iubirii tempter, Andi Constantin. Ioana Filimon, Miss Romania 2016 was originally cast but she dropped out before the game began due to a medical emergency. Filimon was replaced by former Mandinga member, Elena Ionescu.

During the game, nine new contestants joined the remaining original contestants.

Season summary

Nomination mechanism
The tribe(s) attend Tribal Council to nominate a certain number of players.
Cycle 1 - Cycle 4: There was only one Tribal Immunity Challenge, the losing tribe would have three nominees, one by vote and two chosen by the Individual Immunity winners.
Cycle 5 - Cycle 16: Two Tribal Immunity Challenges are performed, after each challenge the losing tribe must attend Tribal Council and nominate one of its members by vote. If a tribe wins both challenges, the losing tribe must attend the Tribal Council and two of its members will be nominated, but if each tribe wins a challenge, then both tribes will have one nominees. Also, Individual Immunity Challenge are no more.

Voting history

Reference

External links

Romanian reality television series
2020 Romanian television seasons
Television shows filmed in the Dominican Republic
Romania